'Whiskey Echo' is an Irish-Canadian mini-series that follows a group of young international aid workers who have set up a health centre in Sudan during the Second Sudanese Civil War.

Characters 
Whiskey Echo had a large ensemble cast of characters.

'The Aid Workers'

 Dr. Rollie Saunders (Callum Keith Rennie)
 Jenna Breeden (Joanne Kelly)
 Rachel (Dominique McElligott)
 Carlo (David Alpay)
 Rafe (Jason Barry)
 Mo (San Shella)

'The Refugees'

 Bernadette (Nthati Moshesh)
 Kim (Thapelo Ragedi)

'The Military'

 Simon Mabor (Frederick McCormack)

External links 
 

CBC Television original films
Irish television films
Canadian television miniseries
Irish television miniseries
Canadian drama television films